Semyonovka is a village in the Sevan Municipality of the Gegharkunik Province of Armenia.

History 
The village was founded in 1845 by Molokan settlers from Russia (sectarian Pryguny and Subbotniki), who escaped oppression in Russia.

References

External links 
 
 

Populated places in Gegharkunik Province
Populated places established in 1845